The Optronique Secteur Frontal (OSF) is a long-range optoelectronics system, developed for the French Dassault Rafale combat aircraft.

With its narrow field, the visible waveband capability is truly valuable to identify targets in situations where visual contact is required by the rules of engagement.

It allows target tracking through IRST (Infrared search and track) and visual sensors: 
 on the left, the main IR detector can be used as FLIR (to send a video signal to the pilot), or to detect:
 air targets (at ranges up to 100 km)
 surface or sea targets (up to 6 km)
 on the right, a TV/IR sensor us used for target identification (40 km range) and includes a laser rangefinder.

The benefits in air-air confrontation are: 
 passive long-distance detection
 target identification before engagement

References 

Military sensor technology